John Thomas Diamond  (21 June 1912 – 20 February 2001) was an amateur New Zealand historian and archaeologist. Over 70 years, Diamond documented the industrial, archaeological and social history of West Auckland.

Life and work
Diamond became interested in history after finding Māori artifacts on a farm near Warkworth where he was working.

Diamond was an avid explorer of the Waitākere Ranges, recording and reporting on historic sites for the Auckland Regional Authority, the University of Auckland and Waitematā City Council. He published many books and papers about the history and stories of West Auckland. In 1975, he was asked by the Auckland Regional Authority and Lands and Survey Department to suggest names for unnamed streams and features of West Auckland. The 250 new names he suggested were all accepted and included on maps. 

He was a founding member of the West Auckland Historical Society and an honorary life member of the Auckland regional committee of the New Zealand Historic Places Trust.

Honours and awards
In the 1986 Queen's Birthday Honours, Diamond was appointed a Member of the Order of the British Empire, for services to archaeology. In December 1999, he received a Waitakere City Council Millennium Medal for his services to the community and heritage of the west.

Legacy
Diamond left his collection of papers, research notes, photographs and slides to Waitakere Libraries. These now form the J. T. Diamond West Auckland History Collection which was added to the UNESCO Memory of the World Aotearoa New Zealand register in 2017.

Selected works

References

External links
Industry in the west
Mysterious Mrs. Diamond
Photographs by J. T. Diamond in Auckland Libraries' heritage collections
West Auckland world of Jack Diamond

1912 births
2001 deaths
20th-century New Zealand historians
New Zealand archaeologists
New Zealand Members of the Order of the British Empire
Writers from Auckland
Amateur archaeologists